Blackcurrant, Ribes nigrum, is a woody shrub grown for its berries.

Black currant or blackcurrant may also refer to:

Plants
 Carissa spinarum, a tropical plant native to areas around the Indian Ocean
 Ribes americanum, American black currant
 Ribes hudsonianum, northern black currant, native to North America
 Ribes laxiflorum, trailing black currant
 , Korean blackcurrant, in the genus Ribes
 Zante currant, dried Black Corinth grapes

Other
 The Black Currant, a character in the comic strip Thrud the Barbarian
 Operation Blackcurrant in the UK, to maintain electrical supply during the extreme weather of early 1947

See also
 Black Current (disambiguation)
 Black gooseberry
 Currant (disambiguation)
 Current (disambiguation)